is a Japanese table tennis player. With doubles partner Masataka Morizono, he won the gold medal in the men's doubles event at both the 2015 and 2017 ITTF World Tour Grand Finals, as well as winning a silver medal in men's doubles at the 2017 World Championships.

Career records
The following senior career records stand as of April 2018:

Singles
ITTF World Tour Grand Finals: QF (2015); Last 16 (2016, 2017)
ITTF World Tour
Winner: 2015 Philippines Open, 2016 Swedish Open
Asian Championships: Last 16 (2015, 2017)
Summer Universiade: Runner-up (2015)

Men's doubles
World Championships: Runner-up (2017); QF (2015)
ITTF World Tour Grand Finals: Winner (2015, 2017); Runner-up (2016)
ITTF World Tour
Winner: 2014 Czech Open, 2015 Croatia Open, 2016 German Open, 2016 Polish Open, 2017 India Open, 2017 Qatar Open
Runner-up: 2018 Qatar Open
Asian Championships: SF (2015); QF (2017)
Summer Universiade: Winner (2017); Runner-up (2015)

Mixed doubles
Asian Championships: SF (2015)

Team events
World Team Championships: Runner-up (2016); QF (2018)
World Team Cup: Runner-up (2018); QF (2015)
Asian Championships: Runner-up (2015); SF (2017)
Summer Universiade: Runner-up (2015, 2017)

References

Japanese male table tennis players
1994 births
Sportspeople from Kyoto
Living people
Universiade medalists in table tennis
World Table Tennis Championships medalists
Universiade gold medalists for Japan
Universiade silver medalists for Japan
Kinoshita Meister Tokyo players
Medalists at the 2015 Summer Universiade
Medalists at the 2017 Summer Universiade